Kyaukse is town and capital of Kyaukse District in Mandalay Region, Myanmar. Lying on the Zawgyi River, 25 miles (40 km) south of Mandalay, it is served by the Mandalay-Yangon (Rangoon) railway. The first Myanmar probably settled in the area about 800, and local 12th- and 13th-century inscriptions refer to Kyaukse as “the first home”. Remains of pagodas and old cities are found throughout the area. The Shwethalyaung Pagoda, built by King Anawrahta (1044–77), is located in Kyaukse.

Kyaukse is famous for the Kyaukse elephant dance festival, and for being the home town of former dictator Senior General Than Shwe. The town's industrial zone is one of more than 30 across the country.

Geography 
The surrounding area consists of a level strip running south from Mandalay along the foothills of the Shan Plateau. The area is located in the heart of Myanmar’s dry zone but is drained by the Panlaung and Zawgyi rivers, which were used for an ancient irrigation-canal system that predates Myanmar settlement in the area.

History
Kyaukse has been an important area in Myanmar history. It is well irrigated and lush, and has been ever since the Bagan era when it was known as the granary of the kingdom.

King Anawrahta built numerous fortresses along his kingdom's borders, as well as along the rivers flowing within his lands. Tamote was one of nine fortresses along the rivers of Kyaukse region, erected because he needed protection against invasion by water.

When Than Shwe was in power at the head of the military regime, a heavy industrial zone was established in Kyaukse – supposedly to provide employment, though its population is relatively small. Kyaukse Township is now constituted with one town, 10 wards and 223 villages of 87 village-tracts.

Economy
The Kyaukse area is known for its turmeric, mango and onions. The town has a relatively large shopping centre Aye Mya Kyi Lin Market.

Education
Kyaukse is home to the 
Basic Education High School No. 1 Kyaukse, 
Basic Education High School No. 2 Kyaukse, 
Basic Education High School No. 3 Kyaukse,
Technological University, Kyaukse,
Kyaukse University.

Notable people 
Than Shwe, Myanmar's dictator and Chairman of the State Law and Order Restoration Council
 Saw Tun, a former Minister for Construction of Myanmar
U Thaung, a former Minister for Science and Technology of Myanmar and former member of parliament in the Pyithu Hluttaw
Ashin Wirathu, a nationalist Buddhist monk
Ledwintha Saw Chit, an author
Shwe Sin, an actress and model
Than Khe, Chairman of the All Burma Students' Democratic Front (ABSDF)

Sights of interest
 Shwethalyaung Pagoda
 Shwethalyaung Hill
 Mahar Shwe Thein Daw Pagoda
 Tamote Shinpin Shwegugyi Temple
 Shinpin Set Thwar Pagoda
 Shwemuhtaw Pagoda
 Laymyatna Pagoda
 Shwe Taung Htee Pagoda
 Shwebontha Pagoda
 Dee Doke Waterfall
 Sunye Lake
 Shwehylan Taung Pagoda
 Dattaw Taung Cave Pagoda
 Myinsaing Nanoo Pagoda

Gallery

References

External links

Township capitals of Myanmar
Populated places in Mandalay Region